Fujairah International Airport  is an international airport located  south of central Fujairah City.

New Runway 
On, Sat 3 Dec 2022, Fujairah Airport opened new runway which is more than 3km long and a 45m wide.

Airlines and destinations

References

External links
 Fujairah International Airport website

Year of establishment missing
Airports in the United Arab Emirates
Buildings and structures in the Emirate of Fujairah
Transport in the Emirate of Fujairah
Fujairah City